Hamilton Christian School is a K-12 Christian private school in Lake Charles, Louisiana, United States.

Athletics 
Hamilton Christian School competes in the Louisiana High School Athletic Association in District 4 of Class 1A. 

Hamilton's District 4 rivals include the Basile Bearcats, Elton Indians, Merryville Panthers, Oberlin Tigers, South Cameron Tarpons, St. Edmund Blue Jays, and Grand Lake Hornets.

The Warriors and Lady Warriors compete in a variety of sports. The Warriors compete in baseball, basketball, football, golf, bowling, and track & field (indoor and outdoor), while the Lady Warriors compete in softball, basketball, volleyball, golf, bowling, and track & field (indoor and outdoor).

Notable alumni
 Jace Peterson, professional baseball player currently for the Milwaukee Brewers and formerly of the Baltimore Orioles.

References

External links 
 

Christian schools in Louisiana
Lake Charles, Louisiana
Schools in Calcasieu Parish, Louisiana
Private high schools in Louisiana
Private middle schools in Louisiana
Private elementary schools in Louisiana